Rhesala is a genus of moths of the family Erebidae. The genus was erected by Francis Walker in 1858.

Species
Rhesala albolunata (Moore, 1882) southern India
Rhesala biagi (Bethune-Baker, 1908) New Guinea
Rhesala cervina (Moore, 1882) Manipur
Rhesala cineribasis de Joannis, 1929 Vietnam
Rhesala costiplaga (Holland, 1900) Buru
Rhesala falcata Holloway, 2005 Borneo
Rhesala fusiformis Holloway, 2005 Borneo, Singapore
Rhesala goleta (Felder & Rogenhofer, 1874) Ghana, Cameroon, Ethiopia, Uganda, Kenya, Tanzania, Malawi, Mozambique, Zimbabwe, South Africa
Rhesala grisea (Hampson, 1916) Somalia
Rhesala imparata Walker, 1858 India (Nilgiris, Meghalaya, Manipuri, Kolkata), Sri Lanka, Buru, Celebes, Taiwan, Japan
Rhesala inconcinnalis (Walker, [1866]) Ceram, Amboina
Rhesala irregularis Holloway, 1979 New Caledonia, Fiji
Rhesala moestalis (Walker, [1866]) Sierra Leone, Ivory Coast, Ghana, Nigeria, Gabon, Arabia, Sudan, Somalia, Ethiopia, Kenya, Malawi, Tanzania, Botswana, Mozambique, Zambia, Zimbabwe, Angola, Namibia, South Africa, Comoros, Madagascar, Seychelles, Sri Lanka, Malaysia, New Guinea
Rhesala nigricans (Snellen, 1880) Borneo, Sulawesi
Rhesala nigriceps (Hampson, 1895) Simla, Poona, Bombay
Rhesala nyasica Hampson, 1926
Rhesala punctisigna Hampson, 1926 Kenya

References

Calpinae
Moth genera